Vauhini Vara is a Canadian-born American journalist, fiction writer, and the former business editor of The New Yorker. She lives in Colorado and is a contributing writer for The New Yorker website. Her first novel “The Immortal King Rao” is highly acclaimed and came out in May of 2022.

Biography
Born in Regina, Saskatchewan, Canada, Vauhini Vara was raised in Prince Albert, Saskatchewan (Canada) and in Oklahoma City and Seattle in the United States. She graduated from Stanford University in 2004 and went to work for the Wall Street Journal. In 2008 she left the WSJ to attend the Writers' Workshop at the University of Iowa. She graduated with her MFA in 2010 and then returned to the WSJ for the next three years.

She was a reporter for the Wall Street Journal for almost ten years, where she covered Silicon Valley and California politics. In 2013, she left the Wall Street Journal to launch Currency, the business section of newyorker.com. She has written for Harper's Magazine, Fast Company, The Atlantic, Businessweek, and WIRED. In 2017, she worked as a staff writer for California Sunday, covering politics in the western United States.

Vara is a recipient of the O. Henry Award for her fiction writing, and has published stories in Tin House, ZYZZYVA, among other publications. She studied writing at Stanford University and the Iowa Writers Workshop.

M.E. Kabul writes in the journal Network World of Vara's reportage on corporate computer systems.

Awards and honors
In 2015, Vara received the O. Henry Award for writing, for her story, I, Buffalo. In 2013 she received a McDowell Colony fellowship. She has also received a grant from the Rona Jaffe Foundation. Vara received awards for her journalism from the Samuel I. Newhouse Foundation, the Society of Professional Journalists, and the Northwest Journalists of Color.

Bibliography
 The Immortal King Rao (2022)

References

External links
 Official website
 http://www.newyorker.com/contributors/vauhini-vara

Living people
Year of birth missing (living people)
The New Yorker editors
The Wall Street Journal people
American reporters and correspondents
People from Mercer Island, Washington
Women magazine editors
American women non-fiction writers
21st-century American women
Writers from Prince Albert, Saskatchewan